Jakob Wilhelm Hüber (1787 in Düsseldorf – 1871 in Zurich) was a German landscape painter of the 19th century.

While he is described as a faithful pupil of Hackert, He was influential for the painters of the School of Posillipo. He is known for a series of watercolor vedute of Pompeii, painted in 1817 and first published in 1824 by Heinrich Füssli as aquatints, as Vues pittoresques de Pompéi. Raffaelle Carelli, Achille Vianelli, and Giacinto Gigante were among those who he influenced.

Bibliography

1787 births
1871 deaths
Artists from Düsseldorf
Painters from Naples
19th-century Italian painters
Italian male painters
19th-century German painters
19th-century German male artists
German male painters
German landscape painters
19th-century Italian male artists